Joseph "Ed" Herr (March 4, 1865 – August 1, 1936) was an American professional baseball infielder during the years –. He played for the St. Louis Browns and Cleveland Blues. He was a Union carpenter.

External links

 

1865 births
1936 deaths
Major League Baseball infielders
St. Louis Browns (AA) players
Cleveland Blues (1887–88) players
Baseball players from St. Louis
19th-century baseball players
St. Louis Whites players
Milwaukee Creams players